Peter Searcy is a musician from Louisville, Kentucky.

Spin Magazine, Scott Irwin, and Amanda Green have compared Searcy's straightforward songwriting style and voice to those of Paul Westerberg. Like Paul Westerberg of The Replacements, Searcy is a veteran of the hardcore scene. Searcy was the frontman of the Louisville hardcore punk group Squirrel Bait in the 1980s. After Squirrel Bait disbanded, Searcy (along with Squirrel Bait drummer Ben Daughtrey) formed a funk-rock group called Fanci Pantz.  Fanci Pantz garnered a lot of praise and major label attention, but they broke up before they could record an album.  After the demise of Fanci Pantz, Searcy joined Big Wheel in 1989, which released three albums (two on Mammoth Records) before breaking up in 1993. His next band, Starbilly, released only one album, after which Searcy began performing solo. He released one album, produced by Tim Patalan
 
entitled, "Could You Please and Thank You," on Time Bomb Recordings in 2000. Its style has been compared to that of Counting Crows and The Wallflowers. The album was followed by a self-released EP and a second full-length album on Initial Records in 2004, followed by Spark, now on Label X & Toucan Cove Entertainment.

Peter is a licensed real estate agent.

Discography
Could You Please and Thank You (Time Bomb Recordings, 2000)
Couch Songs (Initial Records, 2004)
Trust Falls (Self-released, 2004)
Spark (Toucan Cove/Universal, 2007)
Fire Escape Promise EP (sonaBLAST! Records, 2011)
Leave It All Out There (Eastwood Records, 2017)

References

External links
 

Year of birth missing (living people)
Living people
Musicians from Louisville, Kentucky
Singer-songwriters from Kentucky
J. Graham Brown School alumni
Squirrel Bait members